Nicola Mei (born October 27, 1985) is an Italian professional basketball player. He last played for Vanoli Cremona.

References

External links
Eurobasket Profile
Legabasket Profile

1985 births
Living people
Italian men's basketball players
Pallacanestro Varese players
Vanoli Cremona players
Guards (basketball)